Voices from the Vacant Lot is an Australian choir from the South Sydney area. Their album Dance on Your Bones was nominated for the 1999 ARIA Award for Best World Music Album.

The group performs songs from many different countries, in various languages.

Discography

Albums

Awards and nominations

ARIA Music Awards
The ARIA Music Awards is an annual awards ceremony that recognises excellence, innovation, and achievement across all genres of Australian music. They commenced in 1987.

! 
|-
| 1999
| Dance on Your Bones
| Best World Music Album
| 
| 
|-

References

Australian choirs
Australian world music groups